The List of shipwrecks in 1780 includes some ships sunk, wrecked or otherwise lost during 1780.

January

2 January

6 January

11 January

15 January

16 January

18 January

19 January

28 January

30 January

31 January

Unknown date

February

1 February

6 February

23 February

24 February

25 February

26 February

27 February

Unknown date

March

2 March

9 March

20 March

Unknown date

April

1 April

9 April

15 April

17 April

23 April

Unknown date

May

9 May

11 May

25 May

31 May

Unknown date

June

9 June

10 June

18 June

Unknown date

July

7 July

Unknown date

August

7 August

Unknown date

September

2 September

7 September

9 September

29 September

30 September

Unknown date

October

4 October

5 October

7 October

8 October

9 October

10 October

11 October

12 October

19 October

22 October

23 October

31 October

Unknown date

November

1 November

4 November

7 November

10 November

23 November

26 November

Unknown date

December

5 December
7

18 December

19 December

31 December

Unknown date

Unknown date

References

1780